Society Snobs is a 1921 American silent comedy film directed by Hobart Henley and starring Conway Tearle, Vivian Forrester and Ida Darling.

Cast
 Conway Tearle as Lorenzo Carilo / Duke d'Amunzi
 Vivian Forrester as Martha Mansfield
 Ida Darling as Mrs. Forrester
 Jack McLean as Ned Forrester
 Huntley Gordon as Duane Thornton

References

Bibliography
 Munden, Kenneth White. The American Film Institute Catalog of Motion Pictures Produced in the United States, Part 1. University of California Press, 1997.

External links
 

1921 films
1921 comedy films
1920s English-language films
American silent feature films
Silent American comedy films
American black-and-white films
Films directed by Hobart Henley
Selznick Pictures films
1920s American films